Luciano Palonsky (born 8 July 1999) is an Argentine professional volleyball player. He is a member of the Argentina national team. At the professional club level, he plays for Tours VB.

Honours

Clubs
 CEV Cup
  2021/2022 – with Tours VB

 National championships
 2017/2018  Argentine Cup, with Ciudad Vóley
 2021/2022  French Championship, with Tours VB

Youth national team
 2016  CSV U19 South American Championship

Individual awards
 2016: CSV U19 South American Championship – Best Outside Spiker

References

External links

 
 Player profile at LegaVolley.it 
 Player profile at Volleybox.net

1999 births
Living people
Volleyball players from Buenos Aires
Argentine men's volleyball players
Pan American Games medalists in volleyball
Pan American Games gold medalists for Argentina
Medalists at the 2019 Pan American Games
Volleyball players at the 2019 Pan American Games
Argentine expatriate sportspeople in France
Expatriate volleyball players in France
Argentine expatriate sportspeople in Italy
Expatriate volleyball players in Italy
Tours Volley-Ball players
Outside hitters